David E. Hohl (born March 25, 1966, in Winnipeg, Manitoba) is retired male wrestler from Canada. He twice represented Canada at the Summer Olympics: in 1992 and 1996. Hohl also twice won a medal at the Pan American Games during his career.

References

External links
 

1966 births
Brock Badgers wrestlers
Commonwealth Games gold medallists for Canada
Living people
Olympic wrestlers of Canada
Sportspeople from Winnipeg
Wrestlers at the 1992 Summer Olympics
Wrestlers at the 1994 Commonwealth Games
Wrestlers at the 1996 Summer Olympics
Canadian male sport wrestlers
Pan American Games silver medalists for Canada
Pan American Games bronze medalists for Canada
Commonwealth Games medallists in wrestling
Pan American Games medalists in wrestling
Wrestlers at the 1991 Pan American Games
Wrestlers at the 1995 Pan American Games
Medalists at the 1991 Pan American Games
Medalists at the 1995 Pan American Games
Medallists at the 1994 Commonwealth Games
20th-century Canadian people